Giessen Army Depot is a former military garrison, located 5.7 km east-northeast of Giessen in Hesse, Germany.

History
The facility opened as a civilian airport in July 1925. The airfield, however dates to the spring of 1911 when it was first used by biplanes. In 1924, a sports flying event was held at the airfield.  In July 1925, Lufthansa operated flights from the new airport to Frankfurt/Main and Kassel. The station building was opened in 1927. Hangars and other buildings began to appear from 1929. In 1933, a beacon was built just off the airfield to facilitate nighttime navigation.

After the establishment of the National Socialist government in 1933, Fliegerhorst Giessen was militarised, and became home to a Combat Wing (Kampfgeschwader 55 (KG-55) "Greif"). The airfield was enlarged and more hangars were built in 1938. Other buildings were marked as commercial warehouses on building plans, masking their use as munitions storage.

United States Army units moved into the Gießen area in April 1945, and designated the airfield as  "Advanced Landing Ground Y-84". It was used briefly as a casualty evacuation and combat resupply airfield by the IX Air Service Command, Ninth Air Force. After the German Capitulation on 8 May, it was re-designated as "Army Air Forces Station Giessen".

Army Air Forces units moved out in July, and the facility was taken over by United States Army units, which converted the facility into the Giessen Army Depot, one of the largest depot facilities in Germany, with its own railway system and warehouses.   The only known Army Aviation use was the Giessen Army Heliport (Giessen AHP) operated by a detachment of the 503d Combat Aviation Battalion. During the 1950s, Elvis Presley was assigned to Giessen.

The facility was closed as a garrison by the United States in 2008, but remained a distribution center for the Army and Air Force Exchange Services (AAFES).

The last of Giessen Army Deport was relinquished to the city in February 2017, when AAFES relocated their distribution center to Germersheim.

References

 Giessen Army Depot
  Y-84 Giessen
 Johnson, David C. (1988), U.S. Army Air Forces Continental Airfields (ETO), D-Day to V-E Day; Research Division, USAF Historical Research Center, Maxwell AFB, Alabama.

World War II airfields in Germany
Airports established in 1944
Airports in Hesse